Maximilian Dittgen (born 3 March 1995) is a German professional footballer who plays as a midfielder for  club FC Ingolstadt 04.

He was a youth international for Germany on multiple levels, most recently for the under-20 team in 2016.

Career
In July 2018, after a one-year loan to SV Wehen Wiesbaden, he joined the team permanently.

In August 2020, after Wehen Wiesbaden's relegation from the 2. Bundesliga, he moved to FC St. Pauli.

On 6 June 2022, Dittgen signed with FC Ingolstadt 04.

Honours
Germany U17
 UEFA European Under-17 Championship: runner-up 2012

References

External links
 

1995 births
Living people
People from Moers
Sportspeople from Düsseldorf (region)
German footballers
Footballers from North Rhine-Westphalia
Association football midfielders
Germany youth international footballers
1. FC Nürnberg II players
1. FC Nürnberg players
SG Sonnenhof Großaspach players
1. FC Kaiserslautern players
SV Wehen Wiesbaden players
FC St. Pauli players
FC Ingolstadt 04 players
2. Bundesliga players
3. Liga players
Regionalliga players